Rakthamichthys rongsaw is a species of swamp eel discovered in the Khasi Hills in northeast India. The researchers were searching for caecilians, when they uncovered the eel in soil.

Taxonomy 
It was formerly classified in the genus Monopterus until a 2020 study found it to group with three other subterranean Monopterus species from the Western Ghats, all of which displayed significant genetic and osteological differences from any other species in Monopterus. Due to this, all species were classified in the new genus Rakthamichthys.

Description 
The eel is also absent from skin pigmentation and has 92 precaudal and 69 caudal vertebra. The eyes have been described as tiny.

References 

Fish of India
Taxa named by Ralf Britz
Taxa named by Dan Sykes
Taxa named by David J. Gower
Taxa named by Rachunliu G Kamei
Fish described in 2018
Freshwater fish of India
rongsaw
Endemic fauna of India